is a Japanese multinational holding company, production enterprise and entertainment conglomerate, best known for its RPG franchises, such as Final Fantasy, Dragon Quest, Star Ocean, and Kingdom Hearts, among numerous others. Outside of video game publishing and development, it is also in the business of merchandise, arcade facilities, and manga publication under its Gangan Comics brand.

The original Square Enix Co., Ltd. was formed in April 2003 from a merger between Square and Enix, with the latter as the surviving company. Each share of Square's common stock was exchanged for 0.85 shares of Enix's common stock. At the time, 80% of Square Enix staff were made up of former Square employees. As part of the merger, former Square president Yoichi Wada was appointed the president of the new corporation, while former Enix president Keiji Honda was named vice president. Yasuhiro Fukushima, the largest shareholder of the combined corporation and founder of Enix, became chairman. In October 2008, Square Enix conducted a company split between its corporate business and video game operations, reorganizing itself as the holding company Square Enix Holdings Co., Ltd., while its internally domestic video game operations were formed under the subsidiary Square Enix Co., Ltd.

Several of Square Enix's franchises have sold over 10 million copies worldwide after 2020, with Final Fantasy selling 173 million, Dragon Quest selling 85 million, and Kingdom Hearts shipping 36 million. In 2005, Square Enix acquired arcade corporation Taito. In 2009, Square Enix acquired British game publisher Eidos plc, which was later absorbed into Square Enix Europe. Square Enix is headquartered at the Shinjuku Eastside Square Building in Shinjuku, Tokyo, and has over 5,000 employees worldwide through its base operations and subsidiaries.

Corporate history

Origins and pre-merger (1975–2003)

Enix (1975–2003)

Enix was founded on September 22, 1975, as Eidansha Boshu Service Center by Japanese architect-turned-entrepreneur Yasuhiro Fukushima. Enix focused on publishing games, often by companies who exclusively partnered with the company. In the 1980s, in a partnership with developers Chunsoft, the company began publishing the Dragon Quest series of console games.

Key members of the developer's staff consisted of director Koichi Nakamura, writer Yuji Horii, artist Akira Toriyama, and composer Koichi Sugiyama, among others. The first game, Dragon Warrior, in the Famicom-based RPG series, was released in 1986 and would eventually sell 1.5 million copies in Japan, establishing Dragon Quest as the company's most profitable franchise. Despite the announcement that Enix's long-time competitor Square would develop exclusively for PlayStation, Enix announced in January 1997 that it would release games for both Nintendo and Sony consoles. This caused a significant rise in stock for both Enix and Sony. By November 1999, Enix was listed in the Tokyo Stock Exchange's first section, indicating it as a "large company".

Square (1983–2003)

Square was started in October 1983 by Masafumi Miyamoto as a computer game software division of Den-Yu-Sha, a power line construction company owned by his father. While at the time, game development was usually conducted —by only one programmer, Miyamoto believed that it would be more efficient to have graphic designers, programmers and professional story writers working together.

In September 1986, the division was spun off into an independent company led by Miyamoto, officially named Square Co., Ltd. After releasing several unsuccessful games for the Famicom, Square relocated to Ueno, Tokyo in 1987 and developed a role-playing video game titled Final Fantasy, which was inspired by Enix's success in the genre with the 1986 Dragon Quest. Final Fantasy was a success with over 400,000 copies sold, and it became Square's leading franchise, spawning dozens of games in a series that continues to the present.

Buoyed by the success of their Final Fantasy franchise, Square developed notable games and franchises such as Chrono, Mana, Kingdom Hearts (in collaboration with The Walt Disney Company), and Super Mario RPG (under the guidance of Super Mario creator Shigeru Miyamoto). By late 1994 they had developed a reputation as a producer of high-quality role-playing video games. Square was one of the many companies that had planned to develop and publish their games for the Nintendo 64, but with the cheaper costs associated with developing games on CD-based consoles such as the Sega Saturn and the Sony PlayStation, Square decided to develop titles for the latter system. Final Fantasy VII was one of these games, and it sold 9.8 million copies, making it the second-best-selling game for the PlayStation.

Merger (2003)
A merger between Square and Enix was considered since at least 2000; the financial failure in 2001 of Square's first movie, Final Fantasy: The Spirits Within, made Enix reluctant to proceed while Square was losing money. With the company facing its second year of financial losses, Square approached Sony for a capital injection, and on October 8, 2001, Sony Corp purchased an 18.6% stake in Square. Following the success of both Final Fantasy X and Kingdom Hearts, the company's finances stabilized, and it recorded the highest operating margin in its history in the fiscal year 2002. It was announced on November 25, 2002, that Square and Enix's previous plans to merge were to officially proceed, intending to decrease development costs and to compete with foreign developers. As described by Square's president and CEO Yoichi Wada: "Square has also fully recovered, meaning this merger is occurring at a time when both companies are at their height."

Some shareholders expressed concerns about the merger, notably Miyamoto (the founder and largest shareholder of Square), who would find himself holding a significantly smaller percentage of the combined companies. Other criticism came from Takashi Oya of Deutsche Securities, who expressed doubts about the benefits of such a merger: "Enix outsources game development and has few in-house creators, while Square does everything by itself. The combination of the two provides no negative factors but would bring little in the way of operational synergies." Miyamoto's concerns were eventually resolved by altering the exchange ratio of the merger so that each Square share would be exchanged for 0.85 Enix shares rather than 0.81 shares, and the merger was greenlit. The merger was set for April 1, 2003, on which date the newly merged entity Square Enix came into being. At the time of the merger, 80% of Square Enix staff were made up of former Square employees. As part of the merger, former Square president Yoichi Wada was appointed the president of the new corporation, while former Enix president Keiji Honda became its vice president. The founder of Enix and the largest shareholder of the newly combined corporation, Yasuhiro Fukushima, was made its honorary chairman.

As a result of the merger, Enix was the surviving company and Square Co., Ltd. was dissolved. In July of that year, the Square Enix headquarters were moved to Yoyogi, Shibuya, Tokyo, to help combine the two companies.

Post-merger and acquisitions (2003–2013)
To strengthen its wireless market, Square Enix acquired mobile application developer UIEvolution in March 2004, which was sold in December 2007, and the company instead founded its own Square Enix MobileStudio in January 2008 to focus on mobile products. In January 2005, Square Enix founded Square Enix China, expanding their interests in the People's Republic of China.

In September 2005, Square Enix bought the gaming developer and publisher Taito, renowned for their arcade hits such as Space Invaders and the Bubble Bobble series; Taito's home and portable console games divisions were merged into Square Enix itself by March 2010. In August 2008, Square Enix made plans for a similar expansion by way of a friendly takeover of video game developer Tecmo by purchasing shares at a 30 percent premium, but Tecmo rejected the proposed takeover. Tecmo would later merge with Koei in April 2009 to form Koei Tecmo. In April 2007, Square Enix Ltd. CEO John Yamamoto also became CEO of Square Enix, Inc. In 2008–2009, Square Enix was reportedly working with Grin on a Final Fantasy spin-off codenamed Fortress. The project was allegedly canceled by Square Enix after introducing seemingly impossible milestones and without payments made, resulting in Grin declaring bankruptcy and its co-founders blaming Square Enix for being "betrayed".

In February 2009, Square Enix announced a takeover deal for SCi Entertainment briefly renamed Eidos plc, the holding company for Eidos Interactive, the UK-based publisher of the Tomb Raider, Hitman, Deus Ex, Thief, and Legacy of Kain franchises, along with its multiple subsidiary development studios that developed the games The acquisition of Eidos was completed in April 2009, and in November the publisher was merged with Square Enix's European publishing organization to form Square Enix Europe. In April 2010, a new Japanese label for Western games bearing CERO restrictions called Square Enix Extreme Edges was announced. In July 2010, Mike Fischer was appointed CEO of Square Enix, Inc.

In March 2011, Square Enix founded the mobile development studio Hippos Lab and Square Enix Montréal in 2012. In July 2011, it was reported that Square Enix closed their Los Angeles Studio. In January 2012, Square Enix North American office could pursue smaller niche, mobile and social media games due to its existing revenue streams. In October 2012, Square Enix was perceived as a "force in mobile" games by Kotaku. The price of Final Fantasy Dimensions and Demons' Score, $30 and $44 respectively, was criticized.

Restructuring (2013)
On March 26, 2013, citing sluggish sales of major Western games, Square Enix announced major restructuring, expected loss of ¥10 billion and resignation of President Yoichi Wada, whom Yosuke Matsuda replaced. Phil Rogers was elected as a new Director, among others. With the restructuring, Square Enix of America CEO Mike Fischer left the company in May, with former Square Enix Europe CEO Phil Rogers becoming CEO of Americas and Europe. Further executive changes at Square Enix Western studios were mentioned in a statement. With the consolidation of Square Enix Western divisions around 2015, Square Enix Ltd. and Square Enix Inc. are collectively referred to as Square Enix West.

It said with the fiscal year report in March 2013, sales of Tomb Raider (2013) and Hitman: Absolution were weak, despite critical acclaim. The North American sales force was said to be ineffective as the game sold two-thirds the number of units it did in Europe. Price pressure was intense, which forced spending additional channel costs such as price protection. Matsuda noted the long development time of their important games and said they need to shift to a business model with frequent customer interactions, noting Kickstarter as an example, and finally, make sure games meet customer expectations.

Post-restructuring (2013–present)
In March 2013, Square Enix India opened in Mumbai; however the studio was closed in April 2014 and later reopened five years later. As well as Square Enix Latin America in Mexico, which was closed in 2015. A mobile studio called Smileworks was founded in Indonesia in June 2013; however it was closed in January 2015.

In 2014, Square Enix signed a strategic alliance with Japanese and French video game companies, Bandai Namco Entertainment and Ubisoft; it has served as the Japanese publisher of video games and a crossover production since 2009. In March 2014, following the success of Bravely Default, Square Enix said it will "go back to their roots" and focus on creating content that will appeal to their core audience. In 2015, Square created a new studio known as Tokyo RPG Factory to develop what was then dubbed Project Setsuna.

On February 21, 2017, the formation of a new studio Studio Istolia was announced. The studio, headed by Hideo Baba, would be working on the new RPG Project Prelude Rune. Baba departed the studio in early 2019, and shortly after this, Studio Istolia was closed, and Project Prelude Rune cancelled following an assessment of the project, with its staff being reassigned to different projects within the company.

In 2019, Square Enix opened an Indian office again, now in Bangalore, which expanded into publishing mobile games for the Indian market in 2021. In March 2021, Forever Entertainment, a Polish studio, was reported to be working to bring several of Square Enix's properties to modern systems.

On May 1, 2022, Square Enix announced that it would sell several assets of their Square Enix Europe subsidiary to the Swedish holding company Embracer Group for $300 million. This included studios Crystal Dynamics, Eidos-Montréal, and Square Enix Montreal, IPs Deus Ex, Legacy of Kain, Thief, and Tomb Raider and rights to "over 50 games". Square Enix stated that the sale will further help it in investment into blockchain and other technologies, and to "assist the company in adapting to the changes underway in the global business environment by establishing a more efficient allocation of resources". Square Enix also stated that it would remain publisher for the Life Is Strange, Outriders, and Just Cause franchises, implying that they are not included in the sale. However, during the Japanese publisher's full-year financial results briefing on May 13, president Yosuke Matsuda clarified the past statement and said the money from the sale will be used to strengthen the company's core games business. “Rather than using the proceeds from the divestiture in new investment domains such as NFT and blockchain, we intend to use them primarily to fund our efforts to foster solid IP and to enhance our development capabilities in our core Digital Entertainment segment,” he said. The acquisition was closed by August 26, 2022, with the assets being held under CDE Entertainment which is headed from a London office by Phil Rogers, former CEO of Square Enix Americas and Europe. 

On July 25, 2022, Square Enix launched the English version of Manga Up! 

In the company's financial statement for the following quarter, released in September 2022, Matsuda said they were moving away from outright owning studios due to rising costs of development, but were looking at means to invest in studios such as joint ventures or investment opportunities.

In 2022, Square Enix invested in seven business strategic cooperations in the blockchain and cloud services such as Zebedee (United States), Blocklords (Estonia), Cross The Ages (France), Blacknut (France), Animoca Brands-owned The Sandbox (Australia and Hong Kong), and Ubitus (Japan).

On February 28, 2023, Square Enix Holdings announced that on May 1, 2023, Luminous Productions would reorganize and merge with Square Enix internally, citing the merging of the two would “enhanced the group’s abilities to develop HD games”.

On March 3, 2023, Square Enix issued a statement announcing a proposed change to the position of its president and representative director that, if implemented, would result in Yosuke Matsuda stepping down and being succeeded by Takeshi Kiryu, who is presently the company's director. The change will become effective upon approval at the company's 43rd annual shareholders' meeting, which is planned for June 2023, and the board meeting which will follow ahead on the 20th anniversary of the merger.

Corporate structure
On October 1, 2008, Square Enix transformed into a holding company and was renamed Square Enix Holdings. At the same time, the gaming and publishing businesses were transferred to a spin-off named Square Enix, sharing the same corporate leadership and offices with the holding company. The primary offices for Square Enix and Square Enix Holdings are in the Shinjuku Eastside Square Building in Shinjuku, Tokyo.

Development organization
After the merger in 2003, Square Enix's development department was organized into eight Square and two Enix , each focused on different groupings of games. The divisions were spread around different offices; for example, Product Development Division 5 had offices both in Osaka and Tokyo.

According to Yoichi Wada, the development department was reorganized away from the Product Development Division System by March 2007 into a project-based system. The 1st Production Department was formed from the fall 2010 combination of Square Enix's Tokyo and Osaka development studios, with Shinji Hashimoto as its corporate executive.

In December 2013, Square Enix's development was restructured into 12 Business Divisions. In 2017, Business Division 9 was merged into Business Division 8, while Business Divisions 11 and 12 merged to become the new Business Division 9, while a new Business Division 11 was created with some staff from Business Division 6.

In 2019, Square Enix announced that their eleven Business Divisions would be consolidated into four units by 2020 with a new title, Creative Business Unit. Naoki Yoshida, who was previously the head of Business Division 5, became the head of Creative Business Unit III.
The current structure for the development and production division called Creative Business Unit is as follows:

 Creative Business Unit I is led by Yoshinori Kitase, who was the head of Business Division 1 and focuses on Final Fantasy single-player titles, spin-offs, SaGa and Kingdom Hearts. The department comprises the former Business Division 1 (Mainline single-player Final Fantasy such as Final Fantasy XIII and Final Fantasy VII Remake), Business Division 3 (Kingdom Hearts, Final Fantasy spin-offs, The World Ends with You,  SaGa series), and Business Division 4 (Final Fantasy spin-offs produced with external companies, e.g., Dissidia Final Fantasy NT, Theatrhythm Final Fantasy, Final Fantasy Record Keeper).
 Creative Business Unit II is led by Yuu Miyake, who was the head of Business Division 6 and focuses on the Dragon Quest, Nier and Bravely series, as well as arcade games. The department comprises the former Business Division 6 (Dragon Quest series, Nier series), Business Division 7 (Lord of Vermilion, Gunslinger Stratos) and Business Division 11 aka "Team Asano" (Bravely series, Octopath Traveler series).
 Creative Business Unit III is led by Naoki Yoshida, who was the head of Business Division 5 and focused primarily on MMORPGs, transitioning in 2020 to the single player Final Fantasy XVI. It mainly comprises the former Business Division 5 (Final Fantasy XI, Final Fantasy XIV, Dragon Quest Builders series).
 Creative Business Unit IV is led by Hirokazu Nishikado and focuses on the Mana series, along with co-development and production of remasters and ports. It comprises the former Business Division 8 (Mana series, along with remasters and ports of different franchises), Business Division 9 (Schoolgirl Strikers, Grimms Notes), and Business Division 10 (Million Arthur series, Chaos Rings series).

In those four departments, most of the development is done outside of Square Enix under outsourced development studios, while Creative Business Unit produce and supervise those developers. Most of the internal development done by Creative Business Units are for AAA titles such as mainline Dragon Quest, Final Fantasy, Kingdom Hearts and other series with AAA investment, while their mid-size titles have the development outsourced to other companies for most of the cases such as "Team Asano", a team of producers from Creative Business II who had Artdink and Netchubiyori developing Triangle Strategy or Historia developing the remake of Live A Live.

Business model

The business model of post-merger Square Enix is centered on the idea of "polymorphic content", which consists of developing franchises on multiple potential media rather than being restricted by a single gaming platform. An early example of this strategy is Enix's Fullmetal Alchemist manga series, which has been adapted into two anime television series, two movies, and several novels and video games. Other polymorphic projects include the Compilation of Final Fantasy VII, Code Age, World of Mana, Ivalice Alliance, and Fabula Nova Crystallis Final Fantasy subseries. According to Yoichi Wada, "It's very difficult to hit the jackpot, as it were. Once we've hit it, we have to get all the juice possible out of it". Similar to Sony's Greatest Hits program, Square Enix also re-releases their best-selling games at a reduced price under a label designated "Ultimate Hits".

The standard game design model Square Enix employs is to establish the plot, characters, and art of the game first. Battle systems, field maps, and cutscenes are created next. According to Taku Murata, this process became the company's model for development after the success of Square's Final Fantasy VII in 1997. The team size for Final Fantasy XIII peaked at 180 artists, 30 programmers, and 36 game designers, but analysis and restructuring were done to outsource large-scale development in the future.

Business

Video games and franchises

Square Enix's primary concentration is on video gaming, and it is primarily known for its role-playing video game franchises. Of its properties, the Final Fantasy franchise, begun in 1987, is the best-selling, with a total worldwide sales of over 173 million units as of March 2022. The Dragon Quest franchise, begun in 1986, is also the best-selling; it is considered one of the most popular game series in Japan and new installments regularly outsell other games at the times of their release, with a total worldwide sale of over 85 million units. More recently, the Kingdom Hearts series (developed in collaboration with The Walt Disney Company beginning in 2002) has become popular, with 36 million units shipped as of March 2022. Other popular series developed by Square Enix include the SaGa series with nearly 10 million copies sold since 1989, the Mana series with over 6 million sales since 1991, and the Chrono series with over 5 million sold since 1995. In addition to their sales numbers, many Square Enix games have been highly reviewed; 27 Square Enix games were included in Famitsu magazine's 2006 "Top 100 Games Ever", with 7 in the top 10 and Final Fantasy X claiming the number 1 position. The company also won IGN's award for Best Developer of 2006 for the PlayStation 2.

Square and Enix initially targeted Nintendo home consoles with their games, but Square Enix currently develops games for a wide variety of systems. In the seventh generation of video game consoles, Square Enix released new installments from its major series across all three major systems, including Final Fantasy XIII on both the PlayStation 3 and Xbox 360 and Dragon Quest X on the Wii. Square Enix has also developed titles for handheld game consoles, including the Game Boy Advance, Nintendo DS, PlayStation Portable, Nintendo 3DS, and PlayStation Vita. Also, they have published games for Microsoft Windows-based personal computers and various models of mobile phones and modern smartphones. Square Enix mobile phone games became available in 2004 on the Vodafone network in some European countries, including Germany, the United Kingdom, Spain, and Italy.

Before its launch, Michihiro Sasaki, senior vice president of Square Enix, spoke about the PlayStation 3, saying, "We don't want the PlayStation 3 to be the overwhelming loser, so we want to support them, but we don't want them to be the overwhelming winner either, so we can't support them too much." Square Enix continued to reiterate their devotion to multi-platform publishing in 2007, promising more support for the North American and European gaming markets where console pluralism is generally more prevalent than in Japan. Their interest in multi-platform development was made evident in 2008 when the previously PlayStation 3-exclusive game Final Fantasy XIII was announced for release on the Xbox 360.

In 2008, Square Enix released their first game for the iPod, Song Summoner: The Unsung Heroes. Square Enix made a new brand for younger children gaming that same year, known as Pure Dreams. Pure Dreams' first two games, Snoopy DS: Let's Go Meet Snoopy and His Friends! and Pingu's Wonderful Carnival, were released that year. After acquiring Eidos in 2009, Square Enix combined it with its European publishing wing to create Square Enix Europe, which continues to publish Eidos franchises such as Tomb Raider (88 million sales), Deus Ex (4 million), Thief and Legacy of Kain (3.5 million). In November 2017, Square Enix stopped publishing the Hitman franchise and sold the IP to game developer IO Interactive. Square Enix has also served as the Japanese publisher for Activision Blizzard and Ubisoft games since 2009. In May 2022, Square Enix sold several assets of Square Enix Europe  to Embracer Group, including former Eidos Interactive franchises such as Tomb Raider, Deus Ex, Thief, Legacy of Kain and more than 50 others.

Square Enix owned franchises and games include:
 former Square franchises, such as Seiken Densetsu (Mana);
 former Enix franchises, such as Star Ocean;
 Square Enix created franchises, such as Drakengard;
 Taito franchises, such as Space Invaders;
 Retained former Eidos Interactive franchise Just Cause;
 Square Enix America created games, such as Quantum Conundrum, Motley Blocks;
 Square Enix Europe created franchises, such as Life Is Strange.

Game engines
In 2004, Square Enix began to work on a "common 3D format" that would allow the entire company to develop titles without being restricted to a specific platform: this led to the creation of a game engine named Crystal Tools, which is compatible with the PlayStation 3, the Xbox 360, Windows-based PCs, and to some extent the Wii. It was first shown off at a tech demo shown off at E3 2005 and was later used for Final Fantasy XIII based on the demo's reception. Crystal Tools was also used for Final Fantasy Versus XIII before its re-branding as Final Fantasy XV and its shift onto next-gen platforms. Refinement of the engine continued through the development of Final Fantasy XIII-2, and it underwent a major overhaul for Lightning Returns: Final Fantasy XIII. Since that release, no new titles have been announced using Crystal Tools, and it is believed that the development of the engine has halted permanently.

Luminous Engine was originally intended for eighth-generation consoles and unveiled at E3 2012 through a tech demo titled Agni's Philosophy. The first major console title to be developed with Luminous Engine was Final Fantasy XV; the engine's development was done in tandem with the game, and the game's development helped the programming team optimize the engine.

In addition to Luminous Engine and custom engines made for individual games and platforms before and since Square Enix often uses other companies' engines and programming languages for their video game properties. Epic Games' Unreal Engine 3 was used for games such as The Last Remnant, and more recently, Unreal Engine 4 has been used for projects including Dragon Quest XI, Kingdom Hearts III, and the most recent Final Fantasy VII Remake. Unity has also been used internally for titles including I Am Setsuna, Lost Sphear, and SaGa: Scarlet Grace. The Squirrel language had also been used for the WiiWare title Final Fantasy Crystal Chronicles: My Life as a King.

Online gaming
Before the merger, Enix published its first online game Cross Gate in Japan, mainland China, and Taiwan in 2001, and Square released Final Fantasy XI in Japan in 2002 for the PlayStation 2 and later the personal computer. With the huge success of Final Fantasy XI, the game was ported to the Xbox 360 two years later and was the first MMORPG on the console. All versions of the game used PlayOnline, a cross-platform internet gaming platform and internet service developed by Square Enix. The platform was used as the online service for many games Square Enix developed and published throughout the decade. Due to the success of their MMORPG, Square Enix began a new project called Fantasy Earth: The Ring of Dominion. GamePot, a Japanese game portal, received the license to publish Fantasy Earth in Japan, and it was released in Japan as "Fantasy Earth ZERO." In 2006, however, Square Enix dropped the Fantasy Earth Zero project and sold it to GamePot. Square Enix released Concerto Gate, the sequel to Cross Gate, in 2007.

A next-gen MMORPG code named Rapture was developed by the Final Fantasy XI team using the company's Crystal Tools engine. It was unveiled at E3 2009 as Final Fantasy XIV for PlayStation 3 and Microsoft Windows and would be released on September 30, 2010. Dragon Quest X was announced in September 2011 as an MMORPG being developed for Nintendo's Wii and Wii U consoles, which released on August 2, 2012, and March 30, 2013, respectively. Like XIV, it used Crystal Tools.

Square Enix also made browser games and Facebook games, like Legend World, Chocobo's Crystal Tower and Knights of the Crystals, and online games for Yahoo! Japan, such as Monster x Dragon, Sengoku Ixa, Bravely Default: Praying Brage, Star Galaxy, and Crystal Conquest.

Cloud gaming 
In 2013, Dragon Quest X was brought to iOS and Android in Japan using NTT DoCoMo as the release platform and Ubitus for the streaming technology. In 2014, it was also brought to 3DS in Japan using Ubitus.

On May 8, 2012, Square Enix announced a collaboration with Bigpoint Games to create a free-to-play Cloud gaming platform that "throws players into 'limitless game worlds' directly through their web browser". The service was launched under the name CoreOnline in August 2012. Stating "limited commercial take-up", the service was cancelled on November 29, 2013.

In September 2014, a cloud gaming company called Shinra Technologies (previously Project Flare) was created; however, it was closed in January 2016. On October 9, 2014, Square Enix launched another online game service in Japan called Dive In, which allowed players to stream console games to their iOS or Android devices. The service was monetized by the amount of time the players spent playing, with each game offered for free for thirty minutes. The service was cancelled on September 13, 2015. Some Square Enix games are available in Japan on the G-cluster streaming service.

Arcade/Amusement 
With the merger of Taito businesses into Square Enix, the company gained possession of Taito's arcade infrastructure and facilities and entered the arcade market in 2005. In 2010 Taito revealed NESiCAxLive, a cloud-based system of storing games and changing them through the internet instead of acquiring physical copies. This system was added to its many arcade gaming locations. The company continues to cater to the arcade audience in Japan with arcade-only titles, with game producers in 2015 stating that Square Enix has a loyal fan base that values the arcade gaming experience. In November 2019, Square Enix announced a "Ninja Tower Tokyo" theme park by its newly established Live Interactive Works division.

Film
The company has made three forays into the film industry. The first, Final Fantasy: The Spirits Within (2001), was produced by Square subsidiary Square Pictures before the Enix merger; Square Pictures is now a consolidated subsidiary of Square Enix. Its box-office failure caused Enix to delay the merger, which was already under consideration before the creation of the film until Square became profitable once again. In 2005, Square Enix released Final Fantasy VII Advent Children, a CGI-animation film based on the PlayStation game Final Fantasy VII, set two years after the events of the game. A Deus Ex film was in pre-production in 2012 and, as of 2014, was undergoing rewrites. In 2016 Square Enix revealed a film called Kingsglaive: Final Fantasy XV based in the world of Final Fantasy XV and a new web series released on YouTube and Crunchyroll entitled Brotherhood: Final Fantasy XV.

Manga

The company has a manga publishing division in Japan (originally from Enix) called Gangan Comics, which publishes content for the Japanese market only. In 2010, however, Square Enix launched a digital manga store for North American audiences via its Members services, which contains several notable series published in Gangan anthologies. Titles published by Gangan Comics include Fullmetal Alchemist, Soul Eater, and many others. Other titles include manga adaptations of various Square Enix games, like Dragon Quest, Kingdom Hearts and Star Ocean. Some of these titles have also been adapted into anime series. Fullmetal Alchemist is the most successful title of Square Enix's manga branch, with more than 64 million volumes sold worldwide. It is licensed in North America by Viz Media, while its two anime adaptations were licensed by Funimation (now known as Crunchyroll) in North America. Starting in Q4 2019, Square Enix began publishing some of its manga series in English.

Merchandise
Square Enix has created merchandise for virtually all of their video game franchises, many items are available only in Japan. Starting in 2000, Square Enix's former online gaming portal PlayOnline sold merchandise from game franchises including Parasite Eve, Vagrant Story, Chocobo Racing, Front Mission, Chrono Cross, and Final Fantasy. Mascots from game franchises are a popular focus for merchandise, such as the Chocobo from Final Fantasy, which has been seen as a rubber duck, a plush baby Chocobo, and on coffee mugs. Square Enix also designed a Chocobo character costume for the release of Chocobo Tales. The Slime character from Dragon Quest has also been frequently used in Square Enix merchandise, especially in Japan. On the Japanese Square Enix shopping website, there is also a Slime-focused section called "Smile Slime". Slime merchandise includes plush toys, pencil cases, keychains, game controllers, a stylus, and several board games, including one titled Dragon Quest Slime Racing. In Japan, pork-filled steam buns shaped like slimes have been sold in 2010. For Dragon Quest's 25th anniversary, special items were sold, including business cards, tote bags, and crystal figurines. Rabites from the Mana series have appeared in several pieces of Square Enix merchandise, including plush dolls, cushions, lighters, mousepads, straps, telephone cards, and T-shirts. Square Enix has also made merchandise for third party series, including figures Mass Effect and Halo in 2012. Beginning in 2012, it has shops called "Square Enix Cafe" in Tokyo, Osaka and Shanghai, which display and sell merchandise, as well as serve café food.

Subsidiaries

Former subsidiaries

Notes

References

External links
 

 
Book publishing companies in Tokyo
Comic book publishing companies in Tokyo
Companies listed on the Tokyo Stock Exchange
Conglomerate companies based in Tokyo
Conglomerate companies established in 1975
Conglomerate companies of Japan
Entertainment companies established in 1975
Holding companies based in Tokyo
Holding companies established in 1975
Japanese brands
Japanese companies established in 1975
Keiretsu
Magazine publishing companies in Tokyo
Manufacturing companies based in Tokyo
Mass media companies based in Tokyo
Mass media companies established in 1975
Mass media companies of Japan
Multinational companies headquartered in Japan
Multinational publishing companies
Software companies based in Tokyo
Trading card companies
Video game companies established in 1975
Video game companies of Japan
Video game development companies
Video game publishers